Bożena Kamińska (born 1965) is a Polish politician. She was elected to the Sejm in 2011 and 2015. She ran in 2019, but was not reelected.

References

1965 births
Living people
Members of the Polish Sejm 2011–2015
Members of the Polish Sejm 2015–2019